"Trip Around the Sun" is a song by American country music artists Jimmy Buffett and Martina McBride in August 2004 as the second single from Buffett's album License to Chill. The song was written by Stephen Bruton, Al Anderson, and Sharon Vaughn and it was originally recorded by Bruton in 1998 on his album Nothing But the Truth.

Music video
The music video was directed by Trey Fanjoy and premiered in November 2004. It was filmed near Charleston, South Carolina.

Chart performance
The song debuted at number 45 on the U.S. Billboard Hot Country Singles & Tracks chart for the week of September 4, 2004.

References

2004 singles
Jimmy Buffett songs
Martina McBride songs
Male–female vocal duets
Songs written by Al Anderson (NRBQ)
Songs written by Sharon Vaughn
Music videos directed by Trey Fanjoy
RCA Records Nashville singles
2004 songs